The 2024 National Hurling League, known for sponsorship reasons as the Allianz Hurling League, is the 93rd season of the National Hurling League, an annual hurling competition held in Ireland for county teams. Three English county teams also feature.

It takes place between February and April.

Format 
League structure

Thirty-five teams compete in the 2024 NHL –

 twelve teams organised in two six-team groups of approximately equal strength in Division 1
 six teams in Divisions 2A, 2B and 3A
 five teams in Division 3B.

All thirty-two county teams from Ireland take part. London, Lancashire and Warwickshire complete the lineup.

Each team plays all the other teams in their group or division once, either home or away. Two points are awarded for a win, and one for a draw.

Tie-breaker

 If only two teams are level on league points, the team that won the head-to-head match is ranked ahead. If this game was a draw, score difference (total scored minus total conceded in all games) is used to rank the teams.
 If three or more teams are level on league points, score difference is used to rank the teams.

Finals, promotions and relegations

Division 1

 The top two teams in each group play in the NHL semi-finals and final.
 The bottom team in each group meet in a relegation play-off, with the losers being relegated to Division 2A

Division 2A

 Second and third place meet in the Division 2A semi-final
 The first-placed team plays the semi-final winner in the Division 2A final, with the winners being promoted to Division 1
 The bottom team is relegated to Division 2B

Division 2B

 Second and third place meet in the Division 2B semi-final
 The first-placed team plays the semi-final winner in the Division 2B final, with the winners being promoted to Division 2A
 The bottom two teams meet in a relegation play-off, with the losers being relegated to Division 3A

Division 3A

 Second and third place meet in the Division 3A semi-final
 The first-placed team plays the semi-final winner in the Division 3A final, with the winners being promoted to Division 2B
 The bottom team is relegated to Division 3B

Division 3B

 Second and third place meet in the Division 3B semi-final
 The first-placed team plays the semi-final winner in the Division 3B final, with the winners being promoted to Division 3A

Division 1

Division 1 Table

Division 2A

Division 2A Table

Division 2B

Division 2B Table

Division 3A

Division 3A Table

Division 3B

Division 3B Table

References 

Hurling
Hurling in Ireland